Enugu West Senatorial District in Enugu State covers five local governments of Aniniri, Awgu, Ezeagu, Oji River and Udi. Agwu is the collation centre for Enugu West Senatorial District. Deputy President of the 6th, 7th and 8th Nigerian Senate, Ike Ekweremadu currently serving a 5th term in the senate is from this Senatorial District.

List of senators representing Enugu West

References 

Politics of Enugu State
Senatorial districts in Nigeria